The men's shot put event at the 1961 Summer Universiade was held at the Vasil Levski National Stadium in Sofia, Bulgaria, in September 1961.

Results

References

Athletics at the 1961 Summer Universiade
1961